Robin Zeng Yuqun is a Chinese billionaire business magnate. He is the founder and chairman of the battery manufacturer Contemporary Amperex Technology (CATL).

Early life and education 
Zeng is from Fujian Province. He holds a Ph.D. in physics from the Institute of Physics, Chinese Academy of Sciences.

Career 
In 1999, Zeng founded Amperex Technology Limited (ATL), a company manufacturing lithium polymer batteries. In 2005 ATL was acquired by Japan's TDK company, but Zeng continued as a manager for ATL. 

In 2012, Zeng and vice-chairman Huang Shilin spun-off the EV battery operations of ATL into the new company CATL, which manufactures lithium-ion rechargeable batteries and rose to become one of the world's leading manufacturers in the years that followed. In 2017, the company went public on Shenzhen Stock Exchange.

As of March 2022, his fortune was estimated at $46.8 billion, making him one of the richest people in the world.

References 

1968 births
Living people
21st-century Chinese businesspeople
Billionaires from Fujian
Businesspeople from Fujian
Businesspeople in manufacturing
Chinese technology company founders
People from Ningde